John Eddie is the eponymous debut album by American rock musician John Eddie, released in 1986. Eddie is backed by members of Bruce Springsteen's E Street Band.

The album features the hit single "Jungle Boy", which peaked at No. 52 on the Billboard Hot 100 and No. 17 on the Top Rock Tracks chart in the US. In addition, a music video filmed in black and white featuring Eddie dancing was filmed for "Jungle Boy".

Track listing

References

External links
John Eddie at iTunes

1986 debut albums
John Eddie albums